Noginskaya is a rural locality (a village) and the administrative center of Noginskoye Rural Settlement, Syamzhensky District, Vologda Oblast, Russia. The population was 650 as of 2002. There are 9 streets.

Geography 
Noginskaya is located 3 km south of Syamzha (the district's administrative centre) by road. Syamzha is the nearest rural locality.

References 

Rural localities in Syamzhensky District